El Caraño Airport  is an airport serving Quibdó in the Chocó Department of Colombia.

The Quibdo VOR-DME (Ident: UIB) and non-directional beacon (Ident: UIB) are located on the field.

In 2016, the airport handled 368,920 passengers, and 347,208 in 2017.

Airlines and destinations

See also
Transport in Colombia
List of airports in Colombia

References

External links 
OpenStreetMap - El Caraño
OurAirports - El Caraño
FallingRain - El Caraño Airport
HERE Maps - El Caraño

Airports in Colombia
Buildings and structures in Chocó Department